Tutti Pazzi Per Amore is an Italian television series that aired on Rai 1 from December 7, 2008 to January 1, 2012, consisting of three seasons.

The show is set in Rome and follows the love story between a single father, Paolo Giorgi, and a single mother, Laura Del Fiore, and the adventures of the extended family that originates from their relationship. 
The main characters are Paolo Giorgi and his daughter Cristina, Laura Del Fiore and her son Emanuele and her daughter Nina. Around these main characters develops the story of their grandparents, their uncles and aunts, their colleagues and friends.

Soundtrack

First Season

Second Season

Third Season

In this season the songs are sung by the actors.

Impact and reception

Awards
In 2009 Tutti Pazzi Per Amore has won the Premio Regia Televisiva in the category best fiction. For her portrayal of Lea, the actress Sonia Bergamasco has received the prize for best actress in a supporting role at the RomaFictionFest 2009.

See also
List of Italian television series

External links
 

Italian television series
RAI original programming